Victor Yeung Ho-yin is a District Councillor for the Belcher constituency. He is a former member of the Democractic Party of Hong Kong. In
2003 he was elected with 45.3% (1,937) of the vote. He retained the seat in 2007 with 52.7% (2,135) of the votes. He lost the seat in 2011 and 2015 and regained in 2019 with 52.66% (4,002) of the vote.

References

Democratic Party (Hong Kong) politicians
District councillors of Central and Western District
Living people
Year of birth missing (living people)